The Christ of Havana (Spanish: Cristo de La Habana) is a large sculpture representing Jesus of Nazareth, on a hilltop overlooking the bay in Havana, Cuba. It is the work of the Cuban sculptor Jilma Madera, who won the commission for it in 1953.

Overview
The statue was carved out of white Carrara marble, the same material used for many of the monuments of the Colon Cemetery. It weighs approximately 320 tons. The statue was built from 67 blocks of marble that had been brought from Italy after being personally blessed by Pope Pius XII. The figure of Christ is standing with the right hand held near the chin and the left hand near his chest. Facing the city, the statue was left with empty eyes to give the impression of looking at all, from anywhere to be seen.

The sculpture, located in the Havana suburb of Casablanca, in the municipality of Regla, was inaugurated on La Cabaña hill on December 24, 1958. Just fifteen days after its inauguration, on January 8, 1959, Fidel Castro entered Havana during the Cuban Revolution.

There is a panoramic viewpoint at the site of the sculpture.

Locals say that the statue is intended to depict Christ holding an imaginary cigar in the right hand, and a mojito in his left, honoring popular Cuban culture. Madera has said that the statue's facial features are intended to reflect the racial diversity of Cuba, and that its shoes were modelled on the flip-flops she wore while working in Italy.

See also
 Christ the Redeemer, statue in Rio de Janeiro, Brazil
 Christ of the Ozarks, statue in Arkansas, U.S.
 List of statues of Jesus
 List of tallest statues

References

Buildings and structures in Havana
Tourist attractions in Havana
Colossal statues of Jesus
1958 sculptures